Declan Edwards (born 23 December 1989) is an Irish former footballer who played as a striker. He represented Stockport County, Galway United and Northwich Victoria.

Career

Edwards joined Stockport County in 2008, having prior to this played for St. Joseph's, Dun Laoghaire. He joined County having played for them on trial against Manchester United in the Manchester Senior Cup in 2007. He made his debut for the club as a substitute against Bristol Rovers in August 2009.

He joined Galway United before the 2009 Irish season began and made his Galway debut on the opening day of the 2009 season. He scored his only league goal at Drogheda United in April 2009. He went on to make a total of 17 appearances scoring twice for the Tribesmen.

He joined Northwich Victoria on loan in September 2009 making his only league appearance as a second-half substitute on his debut at Gainsborough Trinity, a match that Northwich won 4–1. He played in two minor cup matches for the team, scoring his only goal for the club in their Mid-Cheshire FA Senior Cup match against Middlewich Town.

In February 2010 Edwards was on trial at Shamrock Rovers and scored on his debut in the Hoops' first pre-season game.

In March 2010 he was released by Stockport County. He signed for Cork City FORAS Co-op but the deal fell through after international clearance for the transfer was sought.

He has represented his country at Schools level, having played in the Republic of Ireland U18 Schools Centenary Shield match in March 2008.

References

1989 births
Living people
Republic of Ireland association footballers
Stockport County F.C. players
Galway United F.C. (1937–2011) players
Shamrock Rovers F.C. players
League of Ireland players
Association football forwards
Northwich Victoria F.C. players